The social sciences are academic disciplines concerned with society and the relationships among individuals within a society.

Social Sciences may also refer to:

Social Sciences (MDPI journal), published by MDPI
Social Sciences (Science Publishing Group journal), published by Science Publishing Group

The Social Sciences (Medwell Journals journal), published by Medwell Journals
Social Scientist, published by the Indian School of Social Sciences and Tulika Books